Hanover School Division is a public administrative body located in southeastern Manitoba, Canada, responsible for the management of public schools in the Rural Municipality of Hanover, City of Steinbach, Town of Niverville, and the community of Landmark in the Rural Municipality of Taché.  The division operates under the direction of a board of 10 elected trustees representing six wards.  Its offices are located in Steinbach, the third largest city in Manitoba.

History
The Hanover School Division was created by the provincial government as part of a major overhaul of Manitoba's public education system in the 1960s.

Two new schools were constructed in Steinbach and were completed in 2012 and 2013 respectively. One new middle school, Clearspring Middle School with a capacity for about 800 students that was built on the east side of Steinbach. A new high school was also be built on the site of the Steinbach Regional Secondary School and adding it to the original building, effectively expanding the school's capacity. These two new schools were announced as part of the federal deficit spending in 2009 and as a response to the waves of new immigrants attending school. Many schools in the area are filled to capacity and are using temporary structures to house and educate students.

As of late 2016, the latest round of new schools include a new 400 seat 9-12 high school, a 650-seat k-4 elementary school (both for Niverville), a new school for New Bothwell, and a new 480 seat k-4 elementary school in Steinbach.

Schools in the Hanover School Division

See also
 List of school districts in Manitoba

References

External links
 Hanover School Division 

School districts in Manitoba
Education in Steinbach, Manitoba
Eastman Region, Manitoba